Ruby Sparks is a 2012 American romantic fantasy comedy-drama film written by Zoe Kazan and directed by Valerie Faris and Jonathan Dayton. It stars Paul Dano as an anxious novelist whose fictional character, Ruby Sparks, played by Kazan, comes to life, and his struggles to reconcile his idealized vision of her with her increasing independence. The score was composed by Nick Urata of the band DeVotchKa.

Plot 

Calvin Weir-Fields is a novelist who found incredible success at an early age but is struggling to recreate the success of his first book, as well as to forge relationships. His therapist tasks him to write a page about someone who likes his dog, Scotty. After a dream in which he meets a strange young woman, Calvin is inspired to write about her, admitting to Dr. Rosenthal that he is falling in love with this character and telling him all about "Ruby Sparks".

Calvin's brother Harry and sister-in-law Susie come to visit, and Susie finds women's clothing around the house. Harry reads some of Calvin's new writing and criticizes it, saying that his version of a woman is overly idealized and unrealistic. Calvin writes a passage about Ruby falling in love with him, before falling asleep at his typewriter. The next day, he is stunned to find Ruby in his kitchen, a living person. He calls Harry, who does not believe him and advises him to meet with someone to take his mind off things. Ruby is confused by Calvin's behavior and insists on coming along, but he leaves her to shop while he meets with Mabel, a fan of his book who gave him her number. Ruby finds them and believes Calvin is cheating on her; the ensuing confrontation proves she is not a figment of his imagination.

Calvin introduces Ruby to Harry, who is incredulous and suggests alternate explanations, but Calvin proves that his writing directly affects Ruby. He asks Harry not to tell anyone of Ruby's origins, insisting that since he wrote her into existence, he truly knows her, and asserts he will never write about her again.

Months later, Calvin reluctantly takes Ruby to meet his free-spirited mother Gertrude and her boyfriend Mort. While the outgoing Ruby enjoys herself, the introverted Calvin grows jealous of her time with other people, and her happiness fades with his increased gloominess.

Returning home, their relationship becomes tense and a depressed Ruby explains to Calvin how lonely she is, suggesting they spend less time together. Fearful of Ruby's desertion, Calvin writes that Ruby is miserable without him. Ruby returns, now incredibly clingy. Tiring of this, Calvin writes that Ruby becomes constantly happy but he is morose, knowing her happiness is artificial.

After talking with Harry, Calvin tries to write Ruby back to her original self, but his wording leaves her confused. They fight once more, and he attempts to cheer her up by taking her to a party hosted by author Langdon Tharp. Calvin leaves Ruby and talks with others about his unfinished manuscript. He runs into his ex-girlfriend Lila, who accuses him of being uninterested in anyone outside of himself. Langdon finds Ruby alone and flirts with her, convincing her to strip to her underwear and join him in the pool. Furious and humiliated, Calvin drives Ruby home.

They fight, and Ruby tells Calvin that he cannot stop her from doing what she wants. As she prepares to leave, Calvin reveals that she is a product of his imagination and that he can make her do anything he writes. Their growing argument leads to a crazed Calvin forcing Ruby to perform increasingly frenzied and humiliating acts. Ruby collapses and when Calvin tries to approach her—feeling confused, lost, and having no control of her own self—she locks herself in his room.

Distraught and ashamed, Calvin writes a final page stating that as soon as Ruby leaves the house, she is no longer his creation, no longer subject to his will, and is free. He leaves the manuscript outside her door with a note telling her to read the last page and that he loves her. The next morning, Calvin finds the note and Ruby gone.

Time passes, and Harry suggests Calvin write a new book about his experiences with Ruby. The novel, The Girlfriend, is a success. Walking Scotty in the park, Calvin sees a woman who appears to be Ruby but has no recollection of him, reading his book. She says that Calvin also seems familiar, which he deflects by showing her his author's photo on the book. She jokes that they ought to start over, urging him, "Don't tell me how it ends," to which he replies, "I promise."

Cast 
 Paul Dano as Calvin Weir-Fields, a young novelist who struggles with writer's block having not written a full book since his first publication at 19.
 Zoe Kazan as Ruby Tiffany Sparks, a woman who initially is a dream and inspires Calvin to write about her until she eventually manifests herself fully in his life. 
 Chris Messina as Harry Weir-Fields, Calvin's older brother whom he confides in about the true nature of Ruby.
 Annette Bening as Gertrude, Calvin's mother.
 Antonio Banderas as Mort, the carefree boyfriend of Calvin's mother. Banderas took on the role for the opportunity to work with Bening.
 Aasif Mandvi as Cyrus Modi, Calvin's publicist.
 Steve Coogan as Langdon Tharp, a novelist friend of Calvin who he first met when his first book was published. 
 Toni Trucks as Susie Weir-Fields, Harry's wife.
 Deborah Ann Woll as Lila, Calvin's ex-girlfriend who left him before the events of the film and has recently written her own book. 
 Elliott Gould as Dr. Rosenthal, Calvin's therapist who encourages Calvin to write a page about anything not caring if it was bad.
 Alia Shawkat as Mabel, a fan of Calvin's who gives him her number at a book signing.
 Wallace Langham as Warren
 Michael Berry Jr. as Silverlake Passerby

Production

Writing 
The film was written by Zoe Kazan, who plays the eponymous character. Kazan was initially inspired by a discarded mannequin and the myth of Pygmalion, quickly writing twenty pages, before putting the script aside for six months. She returned to the writing when she was clear on the central concept of comparing the idea of love to the actuality of it. 
During the writing, Kazan thought of Woody Allen's The Purple Rose of Cairo and Groundhog Day, wanting to present a slanted version of our own reality. From early in the development, she wrote the lead character Calvin with her boyfriend Paul Dano in mind. On the feminist aspects of the story, Kazan explains she wanted to explore the idea of "being gazed at but never seen", where a woman is not properly understood but in a way that wasn't unkind or alienating for men. She rejects the description of Ruby Sparks as a Manic Pixie Dream Girl, calling it reductive and diminutive, whereas Ruby Sparks is about the danger of idealizing a person, of reducing a person down to an idea of a person.

Kazan thanks Warren Beatty for his indirect encouragement of Paul Dano to develop their own material, and Dano in turn suggested she write a project.

Development 
Kazan shopped the script around and got the attention of Albert Berger and Ron Yerxa, the producers of Little Miss Sunshine, who sent it to directing couple Jonathan Dayton and Valerie Faris, who took it on as the first project since Little Miss Sunshine in 2006. Faris blamed their delay between films on their own need to be ready for the right project.

Location 
Kazan talked about the importance of Los Angeles as the location for the film, comparing it to a character as much as a setting. She sees Los Angeles as a place where it is easy to feel alone and isolated and that fits in with the isolation of Calvin in the story. Directors Dayton and Faris said it was great to show Los Angeles itself, rather than pretending to be another place.

Filming took place largely around the Silver Lake and Los Feliz neighborhoods. Other locations include Grauman's Egyptian Theatre, and the Hollywood Cemetery.

The party hosted by Langdon Tharp is held in a Lloyd Wright-designed house.

Reception

Critical response
On Rotten Tomatoes, the film received a "Certified Fresh" score of 79% based on 181 reviews, with an average rating of 7.10/10. The website's critical consensus states "Cleverly written and wonderfully acted, Ruby Sparks overcomes its occasional lags in pace with an abundance of charm and wit". On Metacritic the film has a score of 67 out of 100 based on reviews from 40 critics, indicating "Generally favorable reviews."

Stephen Holden from The New York Times wrote, "Ruby Sparks doesn't try to pretend to be more than it is: a sleek, beautifully written and acted romantic comedy that glides down to earth in a gently satisfying soft landing." Online film critic Chris Pandolfi from At A Theater Near You called it "an intelligent commentary on the creative process, insecurity, controlling behavior, idealism, and the fragility of the male ego. It's all rather ingeniously combined into one of the most likeable films I've seen all year – a fantasy, a character study, and a cautionary tale all rolled into one."

Box office
Ruby Sparks opened in a limited release in 13 theaters and grossed $140,822, with an average of $10,832 per theater and ranking #28 at the box office. The film's widest release in the U.S. was 261 theaters, and it ultimately earned $2,540,106 domestically and $6,588,157 internationally for a worldwide total of $9,128,263.

Music 

The score was composed by DeVotchKa's Nick Urata.

References

External links 
 
 

2012 films
2010s romantic fantasy films
2012 romantic comedy films
2012 independent films
American independent films
American romantic comedy films
American romantic fantasy films
2010s English-language films
Fox Searchlight Pictures films
2010s French-language films
Films about writers
Films directed by Jonathan Dayton and Valerie Faris
Films set in Los Angeles
Films shot in Los Angeles
Magic realism films
2010s American films